Le'an County is a county of central Jiangxi province, People's Republic of China. It is under the jurisdiction of the prefecture-level city of Fuzhou.

Administrative divisions
In the present, Le'an County has 9 towns, 5 townships and 1 ethic township.
9 towns

5 townships

1 ethic township
 Jinzhu She ethic township

Demographics 

Climate

Notes and references

External links
  Government site - 

County-level divisions of Jiangxi
Fuzhou, Jiangxi